This is a list of the busiest airports in Africa, ranked by total passengers per year, which includes arrival, departure and transit passengers.

Evolution in graph

2022 statistics

2021 statistics

2020 statistics

2019 statistics

2018 statistics

2017 statistics

2016 statistics

2014 statistics

2013 statistics

2012 statistics

2011 statistics

2010 statistics

2009 statistics

2008 statistics

Gallery

See also

List of eponyms of airports

References

Africa
 
Aviation in Africa
 Busiest